The administrator of an estate is a legal term referring to a person appointed by a court to administer the estate of a deceased person who left no will. Where a person dies intestate, i.e., without a will,  the court may appoint a person to settle their debts, pay any necessary taxes and funeral expenses, and distribute the remainder according to the procedure set down at law. Such a person is known as the administrator of the estate and will enjoy similar powers to those of an executor under a will.  A female administrator may be referred to as an administratrix, although this sex-specific term is old.

Wills and trusts